East Georgia Regional  is a city/county-owned public-use airport in Swainsboro, Emanuel County, United States. The airport is located 2 nautical miles (4 km) southeast of the central business district of Swainsboro, Georgia. 
This airport is included in the National Plan of Integrated Airport Systems for 2011–2015, which categorized it as a general aviation facility.

Facilities and aircraft 
East Georgia Regional covers an area of 237 acres (96 ha) at an elevation of 327 feet (100 m) above mean sea level. It has one runway designated 14/32 with an asphalt surface measuring 6,021 x 100 feet (1,835 x 30 m). Runway 14 is equipped with ILS, RNAV and NDB approaches. Runway 36 is equipped for RNAV approaches. The magnetic variation from 2015 is 6 degrees West.

For the 12-month period ending June 24, 2012, the airport had 5,112 aircraft operations, on average 92 per week: 83% general aviation and 17% air taxi. At that time there were 16 aircraft based at this airport: 7 single-engine, 8 multi-engine, and 1 jet.

Airlines and destinations

Cargo operations

Accident 
On August 25, 2018, a Cessna 182A carrying a group of skydivers crashed and burst into flames shortly after takeoff at approximately 2:00 pm EDT, killing the pilot and three of the four passengers.

References

External links 
  Airport Official Website
 Aerial photo as of January 1994 from USGS The National Map
 

Airports in Georgia (U.S. state)
Buildings and structures in Emanuel County, Georgia
Transportation in Emanuel County, Georgia